The Indiana All-Americans are a basketball team in New Castle, Indiana, and members of The Basketball League (TBL).

History
The New Castle NightHawks were a part of the Hoosier Hardwood Basketball Association, a league headed by former Indiana University great Kent Benson for the 2021 season.

On November 10, 2021 The Basketball League announced the Henry County All-Americans for the 2022 season.

The team was renamed as the Indiana All-Americans whose ownership includes former Indiana University great Kent Benson. It was also announced that Kellen Dunham signed up to play for the team. part of The Basketball League for the 2022 season.

Current roster

References

External links

New Castle, Indiana
Basketball teams in Indiana
2021 establishments in Indiana
Basketball teams established in 2020
The Basketball League teams